I Wanna Know is a song by American producer RL Grime. The song features the vocals of American singer Daya, and was released on March 16, 2018, through WeDidit Records.

Background and composition 
In an interview, RL Grime stated: "I've been a big fan of Daya from the jump. We first met when I helped produce her latest single, "New", and have been friends since. She has an incredibly unique and powerful voice, so when I first made the song I knew she'd be perfect for it. I sent her the demo, we met up the next day, and she knocked it out the park."

"I Wanna Know" was RL Grime's first release since October 2017 and was the single released from RL Grime's latest album. The album was later released on July 27, 2018.

The song was released to iTunes on March 16, 2018, through WeDidit Records.

Music video 
The music video for the song was released to YouTube on Daya's channel on May 30, 2018.

The video was set in the early 1990s, comprising Daya and a group of girls dancing at an old motel. The video was directed by Megan Park and celebrates female empowerment.

In an interview, Daya explains: "I love the angle that Megan took on the messaging of the song; she took the desperation and hopelessness of the lyrics and spun them into more of an empowering feel through the gathering of supportive females in the space. Between that and the obvious early 90s references in the wardrobe and props, I think it was the most colorful and exciting shoot I’ve done to date. Excited for the world to see."

Track listing

Charts

Weekly charts

Year-end charts

Release history

References 

2018 singles
2018 songs
Daya (singer) songs
Songs written by Daya (singer)